Irina Kalyanova is a Russian Paralympic judoka. She represented Russia at the 2008 Summer Paralympics held in Beijing, China and at the 2012 Summer Paralympics held in London, United Kingdom and she won two medals: a bronze medal both in the women's +70 kg event in 2008 and in the women's +70 kg event in 2012.

At the 2015 IBSA European Judo Championships held in Odivelas, Portugal, she won the bronze medal in the women's +70 kg event.

References

External links 
 

Living people
Year of birth missing (living people)
Place of birth missing (living people)
Russian female judoka
Judoka at the 2008 Summer Paralympics
Judoka at the 2012 Summer Paralympics
Medalists at the 2008 Summer Paralympics
Medalists at the 2012 Summer Paralympics
Paralympic bronze medalists for Russia
Paralympic medalists in judo
Paralympic judoka of Russia
21st-century Russian women